Jurabek Karimov (Uzbek: Журабек Каримов, Jo'rabek Karimov; born 4 June 1998) is an Uzbekistani tennis player. Karimov began playing tennis aged 7 and he is currently coached by Petr Lebed and Sergey Arkashn.

Karimov has a career high ATP singles ranking of 426 achieved on 27 August 2018. On 15 April 2019, he peaked at world number 279 in the ATP doubles rankings.

Karimov has represented Uzbekistan in Davis Cup, where he has a win–loss record of 4–1. He achieved his first victory in 2018 against British player Cameron Norrie after coming from two sets down.

Style of play

Jurabek Karimov has a double handed backhand. He is very agile and athletic.

Junior Grand Slam finals

Singles

Future and Challenger finals

Singles: 7 (3–4)

Doubles 9 (3–6)

Davis Cup

Participations: (4–1)

   indicates the outcome of the Davis Cup match followed by the score, date, place of event, the zonal classification and its phase, and the court surface.

References

External links
 
 
 

1998 births
Living people
Uzbekistani male tennis players
Sportspeople from Tashkent
Tennis players at the 2018 Asian Games
Asian Games competitors for Uzbekistan
21st-century Uzbekistani people